National Aboriginal Hockey Championships (NAHC) is an ice hockey championship established in Canada by the Aboriginal Sport Circle. The tournament provides an annual opportunity for aboriginal youth across Canada to compete for the NAHC title. Teams are selected and representative of each province and territory.

History 
Founded in 2002, the National Aboriginal Hockey Championships (NAHC) was established by the Aboriginal Sport Circle and sanctioned by Hockey Canada. This annual contest provides an opportunity for elite Bantam and Midget aged Aboriginal youth and attracts participation from First Nations, Inuit and Metis across thirteen provinces and territories. Furthermore, the event aids in fostering cultural unity and pride and celebrates the athletic abilities of Indigenous athletes from across the country). The NAHC also serves as a focal point for grassroots and regional Aboriginal hockey development. Both girls' and boys' teams are eligible to compete in this competition. The location of the tournament varies every year and hosting rights are determined by a bidding policy put in place by the Aboriginal Sport Circle (ASC).

Competition History 
In 2002 and again in 2003, the championship was held in Akwesasne/Cornwall, Ontario. The following year in 2004, the tournament was held in Prince George, British Columbia. Next, the games were held in Miramichi, New Brunswick in 2005. The following year 2006, they took place in Kahnawake, Canada. Thereafter in 2007, the championship was played in Prince Albert, Saskatchewan. The following year 2008 the tournament was played in Sault Ste Marie, Ontario. The following year in 2009 the tournament was played in Winnipeg, Manitoba. In 2010 the Tournament was played in Ottawa, Ontario. The next two years – 2011 and 2012 were played in Saskatoon, Saskatchewan. The following two years – 2013 and 2014 the tournament was played in Kahnawake, Canada again. In 2015 the championship was held in Halifax, Nova Scotia. Following in 2016 the championship was held in Mississauga, Ontario, then in Cowichan, British Columbia in 2017 and in Membertou, Nova Scotia in 2018. The 2019 NAHC will take place in Whitehorse, Yukon, 6–12 May.

Female Division Results 
From 2002 within the female division historically speaking, the data collected from past Championship results suggests that Ontario consistently produces the most successful hockey teams within the female division. Capitalizing on six gold medals, nine silver medals and four bronze medals, they have successfully medaled in thirteen of seventeen tournaments. This is a 76% success rate for Ontario’s Indigenous Female Youth teams. See Table 1. The total number of medals attained by each Province/Territory is recorded in Table 3.1.

Table 1. Female Division: Medal Results (Aboriginal Sport Circle, n.d.)

Male Division Results 
From 2002 within the male division, the data collected from past championship results suggests that Saskatchewan consistently produces the most successful hockey teams within the male division. This province has achieved eight gold medals, one silver medal and two bronze medals; they have successfully medaled in thirteen of seventeen tournaments. This is a 57% success rate for Ontario’s Indigenous Male Youth teams. See Table 2.  The total number of medals attained by each Province/Territory is recorded in Table 3.2.

Table 2. Male Division: Medal Results (Aboriginal Sport Circle, n.d.)

Table 3.1. Total Medal Count: Female Division

Table 3.2. Total Medal Count: Male Division

Key Activities and Awards 
Indigenous youth athletes between the ages of 13-years-old and 18-years-old try-out for their provincial/territorial teams annually. Those individuals who make the team then participate in the annual NAHC as a member of their provincial/territorial team. Each team in the competition is competing against other provinces and territories from across Canada. First, second, and third place finalists are all recognized in this tournament. Both the boys’ and girls’ division first place teams receive gold medals; the teams who place second in each division receive silver medals, while the teams who place third receive bronze medals.

Organizers 
Hosting rights of this event is a result of a successful bidding process performed by provincial/territorial hockey associations. To be eligible, the bid must be approved by its Provincial/Territorial Aboriginal Sport Body (P/TASB). Only one community can bid per Province/Territory. Once selected, the hosting site works with the Aboriginal Sport Circle to coordinate the annual championship. Together they often recruit local volunteers to assist with preparation and execution of the event. Moreover, sponsors aid by providing funding and in-kind contributions for each annual event.

As a sanctioned Hockey Canada event, the NAHC are staged annually during the first two weeks in May. This ensures that the NAHC do not conflict with any of the Provincial/Territorial Bantam and Midget Hockey Championships.

Cultural Practices 
The NAHC is a week-long event with opening ceremonies conducted on the first day and closing awards ceremonies conducted following the final Gold Medal Game. The championship begins with an opening ceremony that includes Indigenous cultural practices. Indigenous attire, music and dance are included in this ceremonial moment that ignites the beginning of the Championship. Additionally, the ceremony often includes an introduction of members of the host committee, special speakers, and VIP guests. All teams participating in the Championship are present during the opening ceremony.

References

External links

Ice hockey tournaments in Canada
Indigenous culture in Canada
First Nations sportspeople